Essay is a commune in the Orne department in north-western France.  The town is mainly known nowadays for its motorsports tracks, and hosted a round of the 2011 European Rallycross Championship.

See also
Communes of the Orne department
Normandie-Maine Regional Natural Park

References

External links
Local motor sports

Communes of Orne